Frank Maziya (born 22 May 1961) is a Swazi sprinter. He competed in the men's 100 metres at the 1988 Summer Olympics.

References

1961 births
Living people
Athletes (track and field) at the 1988 Summer Olympics
Swazi male sprinters
Olympic athletes of Eswatini
Place of birth missing (living people)